Divotvorný klobouk is a 1952 Czech musical comedy film directed by Alfréd Radok.

Production
The state owned film production studio allocated a very small budget, because the film was not ideological and therefore not considered important. During the shooting Radok was criticized for being a formalist, the filming was stopped and the movie was almost given to another director. At the screening for the film council the film was criticized for being too expressionistic and unrealistic. Later it was recommended to not be sent to distribution. Radok was forced to make changes in the movie and was fired from the film studio.

Cast
Saša Rašilov as Merchant Koliáš
Josef Kemr as Painter Antonín Strnad
Zdeněk Dítě as Student Tomáš Křepelka
Alena Kreuzmannová as Bětuška, Koliáš's niece
Theodor Pištěk as Innkeeper Barnabáš
Rudolf Pellar as Folksinger Pohořalský
Jiří Novotný as Apprentice František
František Kovářík as Veteran Václav
Jaromír Pleskot as Butler Zvonek
Jarmila Bechyňová as Publican
František Šlégr as Informer Knopp

References

External links

1952 films
1952 musical comedy films
Czechoslovak musical comedy films
Czech musical comedy films
1950s Czech-language films
Czechoslovak black-and-white films
1950s Czech films